The Suicide Shop is a 2012 French adult animated film written and directed by Patrice Leconte and is based on Jean Teule's novel of the same name.

It was released on 16 May 2012 in France. As with the source material, it centers on an undepressed child born into a proprietorial family that runs a shop that sells suicide adjuncts in a dilapidated, near future city.

Plot 
In a gloomy French city with a high suicide rate is a shop where customers can find everything necessary to efficiently commit suicide in whatever manner they wish. The shop has been run by the Tuvache family, which consists of two apathetic children, Vincent and Marilyn, and their parents, who keep the business running. Things are going great until Lucrèce Tuvache, the mother, gives birth to her third child, Alan. Even as a baby, he can't help but smile and find happiness in everything he sees. Unfortunately for the business, his bubbly personality starts to affect the customers. Mishima, Alan's father, starts to grow tired of Alan's personality and gives him a pack of cigarettes in hopes that it'll kill him faster. Mishima's mental state slowly deteriorates as Alan starts to make him feel guilty for his customers' deaths. He later winds up attempting suicide and is sent to a therapist who claims he's schizophrenic. He's forced to stay in bed for two weeks while Alan and his classmates start to stop the customers from committing suicide. Though Marilyn and the mother are warming up to him, Alan is still proving to be problematic to the business as he asks his friend's uncle to build a car with a music center so loud that it shakes all the supplies in the shop off the shelves and onto the floor where they'll break. Though Vincent shuts off the car as soon as he can, the damage has already been done. Alan gets scolded by his mother, however, a young boy who was there as a customer has met and fallen in love with Marilyn and proposed to her then and there. As Marilyn agrees to marry him, the mother feels grateful that Alan did what he did. Everyone, including Vincent, is finally happy. The new fiancé bakes crepes for the family and, attracted by the smell of them, Mishima awakes and comes out of his bedroom. He angrily demands an explanation for the wreckage of their shop to which Alan admits to causing. Mishima is furious and chases after him with a sword in hand. On a roof of a skyscraper, Alan fakes suicide, throwing himself off the building. The family despairs until Alan bounces back up from the jump after landing on a sheet his friends were holding, making his father laugh for the very first time. The suicide shop becomes a crèpes shop, but Mishima secretly sells cyanide crèpes for those who still long for death.

Voice cast 
 Bernard Alane as Mishima Tuvache, the father
 Isabelle Spade as Lucrèce Tuvache, the mother
 Kacey Mottet Klein as Alan Tuvache, the son
 Isabelle Giam as Marilyn, the daughter
 Laurent Gendron as Vincent, the son
 Pierre-François Martin-Laval as the handsome boy
 Eric Métayer as psychiatrist / the tramp
 Jacques Mathou as Mr Calmel / Mr Dead-For-Two
 Urbain Cancelier as the doctor / Neurasthenia
 Pascal Parmentier as Uncle Dom / the gymnastics instructor
 Edouard Prettet as the melancholia
 Jean-Paul Comart as the guard / the bridges suicidal
 Nathalie Perrot as the little woman n°1
 Annick Alane as the old little woman / the little woman n°2
 Juliette Poissonnier as Ms Dead-For-Two / the woman
 Philippe du Janerand as the fever man/ the spouse

Reception
Review aggregation website Rotten Tomatoes reported an approval rating of 71%, based on 7 reviews, with an average score of 6.5/10.

Accolades

References

External links 

2012 animated films
2012 films
Animated films based on novels
Films based on French novels
Films directed by Patrice Leconte
2010s French animated films
2010s musical films
Belgian animated films
Films produced by Thomas Langmann
French-language Belgian films
French adult animated films
Canadian adult animated films
2010s Canadian films